The 1997 USISL D-3 Pro League was the 11th season of third-division soccer in the United States, and was the first season of now-defunct USISL D-3 Pro League.

New clubs 
 Arizona Sahuaros
 Cleveland Caps
 Daytona Tigers
 Indiana Blast
 Los Angeles Fireballs
 Myrtle Beach Seadawgs
 South Jersey Barons
 Stanislaus County Cruisers
 Tallahassee Tempest
 Vermont Voltage

League standings

Albuquerque gets a bye to the national semifinal as hosts.

Playoffs
Division Semi-finals:
 Central Jersey defeated North Jersey 2-1 (SO)
 New Hampshire defeated Rhode Island 2-1 (OT)
 Baltimore defeated Philadelphia 2-1
 New Jersey defeated Reading, 2-1
 Myrtle Beach defeated Florida, 5-1
 Charlotte defeated South Carolina 3-2
 Indiana defeated Cleveland 3-2
 San Antonio defeated Austin, 4-2
 Houston defeated Tulsa, 4-1
 San Francisco Bay defeated San Gabriel Valley, 5-0
 Chico defeated Sacramento, 6-1
Division Finals:
 New Hampshire defeated Central Jersey, 2-0
 Baltimore defeated New Jersey, 3-0
 Charlotte defeated Myrtle Beach, 3-3 (SO)
 Indiana defeated Chicago, 1-0
 Houston defeated San Antonio, 2-0
 San Francisco defeated Chico, 2-0
Quarterfinals:
 San Francisco Bay defeated Houston, 3-0
 New Hampshire defeated Baltimore 1-0 (OT)
 Charlotte defeated Indiana, 6-0
Semifinals:
 Charlotte defeated San Francisco Bay, 4-2
 Albuquerque defeated New Hampshire 2-1 (OT)
CHAMPIONSHIP:
 Albuquerque defeated Charlotte, 4-1

References

1997
3